Liga Deportiva Universitaria de Quito's 1978 season was the club's 48th year of existence, the 25th year in professional football, the 18th in the top level of professional football in Ecuador and the second in the Serie B.

Squad

Competitions

Serie A

First stage

Results

Serie B

Second stage

Results

Copa Libertadores

First stage

External links
RSSSF - 1978 Serie A 
RSSSF - 1978 Copa Libertadores 

1978